Ahron Ben-Shmuel, also known as Ben Shmuel, Aaron Ben Shmuel (1903–1984) was an American artist, known for his direct carvered stone sculptures, figural granite work and paintings. He worked for the Works Progress Administration (WPA), and he was associated with left-wing politics despite his art having no clear political references.

About 
Ahron Ben-Shmuel was born on 18 January 1903 in New York City, New York. 

He apprenticed for three years as a monument carver at a stone yard and eventually developed his own style. Jackson Pollock studied direct carving techniques under Ahron Ben-Shmuel between 1930 until 1933 in his Greenwich Village studio. 

In 1936, Isamu Noguchi rented two carpenter shacks at 211 East 49th Street, and he repaired them so they could be used as art studios. Ben-Shmuel was Noguchi's friend and he subleased one of the units. The Guild Art Gallery (1933–1937) of New York City showed Ben-Shmuel work, in 1935 a joint exhibition was held with his friend Chaim Gross and two years later in 1937 a joint exhibition with Enrico Glicenstein, and Jean de Marco.

Ben-Shmuel was awarded the Guggenheim fellowship in Fine Arts in 1937 by the John Simon Guggenheim Memorial Foundation. There had been a judged art exhibition that was formed by artists who desired to assist in the World War II effort, titled "Artists for Victory, Inc" (1942) at the Metropolitan Museum of Art, Ben-Shmuel won fifth place with the first prize was awarded to Jose de Creeft.

Death and legacy 
He died 24 February 1984 in Jerusalem, Israel.

Ben-Shmuel's work is included in the permanent museum collection at Smithsonian American Art Museum, Museum of Modern Art (MoMA), Michener Art Museum, Albright-Knox Art Gallery, Brooklyn Museum, among others.

Public art work

References

External links 
 Ahron Ben-Shmuel at Smithsonian American Art Museum

1903 births
1984 deaths
Stone carvers
20th-century American sculptors
Male sculptors
Artists from New York City
Federal Art Project artists